Shardara (Şardara) is a town and the administrative center of Shardara District in Turkistan Region of central Kazakhstan. Population:

References

Populated places in Turkistan Region